The Papua New Guinea Practical Shooting Association is the Papua New Guinean association for practical shooting under the International Practical Shooting Confederation.

References 

Regions of the International Practical Shooting Confederation
Sports organisations of Papua New Guinea